In mathematics, the Bogomolov–Miyaoka–Yau inequality is the inequality

between Chern numbers  of compact complex surfaces of general type. Its major interest is the way it restricts the possible topological types of the underlying real 4-manifold.

Armand Borel and Friedrich Hirzebruch showed that the inequality is  best possible by finding infinitely many cases where equality holds. The inequality is false in positive characteristic:  and  gave examples of surfaces in characteristic p, such as generalized Raynaud surfaces, for which it fails.

Formulation of the inequality
The conventional formulation of the Bogomolov–Miyaoka–Yau inequality is as follows. Let X be a compact complex surface of general type, and let c1 = c1(X) and c2 = c2(X) be the first and second Chern class of the complex tangent bundle of the surface.  Then

 

Moreover if equality holds then X is a quotient of a ball. The latter statement is a consequence of Yau's differential geometric approach which is based on his resolution of the Calabi conjecture.
 
Since  is the topological Euler characteristic and by the Thom–Hirzebruch signature theorem  where  is the signature of the intersection form on the second cohomology, the Bogomolov–Miyaoka–Yau inequality can also be written as a restriction on the topological type of the surface of general type:

moreover if  then the universal covering is a ball.

Together with the Noether inequality the Bogomolov–Miyaoka–Yau inequality sets boundaries in the search for complex surfaces. Mapping out the topological types that are realized as complex surfaces is called geography of surfaces. see surfaces of general type.

Surfaces with c12 = 3c2 

 gave a method for finding examples, which in particular produced a surface X with c = 3c2 = 3254. 
 found a quotient of this surface with c = 3c2 = 45, and taking unbranched coverings of this quotient gives examples with c = 3c2 = 45k for any positive integer k.
 found examples with c = 3c2 = 9n for every positive integer n.

References
 

Algebraic surfaces
Complex surfaces
Differential geometry
Inequalities